is a former Japanese model, actress, radio personality and idol singer who was a member of the Japanese idol girl group Nogizaka46.

Career 
Hashimoto passed the first generation auditions for Nogizaka46 in August 2011. Her audition song was Under Graph's "Tsubasa". She was chosen as one of the members performing on the group's debut single "Guruguru Curtain", released on February 22, 2012.

From April to June 2013 she starred as the heroine in NTV's drama Bad Boys J. In July of that year, she played a recurring role in Fuji TV's Getsuku drama Summer Nude. Hashimoto made her film debut in Bad Boys J: Saigo ni Mamoru Mono which was released on November 9, 2013.

On March 23, 2015, she was chosen as an exclusive model for the women's fashion magazine CanCam, along with fellow first generation Nogizaka46 member Sayuri Matsumura. In April 2015, she began appearing on the Tokyo FM radio show School of Lock! on the third week of the month. On August 28 of the same year, she published her first photobook, Yasashii Toge. It ranked first on the Oricon book ranking in the photobook category, selling 21,000 copies in the first week. It also ranked fourth in the book category. She is the third Nogizaka46 member to publish a photobook, following Mai Shiraishi and Nanase Nishino.

On February 25, 2016, her own intellectual entertainment show, Nogizaka46 Hashimoto Nanami no Koi Suru Bungaku, premiered on UHB. In that show, she introduces a novel on the theme of Hokkaido, where she grew up. She was selected as the choreographic center for the first time on Nogizaka46's sixteenth single "Sayonara no Imi", which was released on November 9, 2016. This is also the last Nogizaka46 single to feature her. On October 20, 2016, she announced her graduation from Nogizaka46 and retirement from the entertainment industry as a whole on the midnight radio show Nogizaka46's All Night Nippon.

On February 16, 2017, her second photobook, titled 2017, was published. It sold 27,185 copies in the first week and ranked first on the Oricon weekly photobook ranking. Her last concert was the first day of the Nogizaka46 5th Year Birthday Live, held at Saitama Super Arena on February 20, 2017.

Discography

Singles with Nogizaka46

Albums with Nogizaka46

Other featured songs

Filmography

Television

Films

Radio

Music videos

Bibliography

Magazines
 CanCam, Shogakukan 1981-, as an exclusive model from May 2015 to March 2017 issue

Photobooks
 NogizakaHa: Nogizaka46 First Shashinshū (2013,)
 Kikan Nogizaka vol.3 Ryōshū (4 September 2014, Tokyo News Service) 
 Yasashii Toge (28 August 2015, Gentosha) 
 Nogizaka46 Second Shashinshū 1 Jikan Okure no I Love You (2016, Shufu to Seikatsusha)
 Hashimoto Nanami Shashinshū 2017 (16 February 2017, Shogakukan)

References

External links 
  
 

Nogizaka46 members
1993 births
Living people
Japanese idols
Japanese women pop singers
Japanese guitarists
Japanese female models
Japanese film actresses
Japanese television actresses
Japanese radio personalities
People from Asahikawa
Musicians from Hokkaido